Eduard ("Ed") van Es (born 28 June 1959 in Wageningen) is a former water polo player from the Netherlands, who finished in sixth position with the Dutch National Men's Team at the 1984 Summer Olympics in Los Angeles.

References
 Dutch Olympic Committee

External links
 

1959 births
Living people
Dutch male water polo players
Olympic water polo players of the Netherlands
Water polo players at the 1984 Summer Olympics
People from Wageningen
Sportspeople from Gelderland
20th-century Dutch people